Open music is music that is shareable, available in "source code" form, allows derivative works and is free of cost for non-commercial use. It is the concept of "open source" computer software applied to music. However, the non-commercial stipulation associated with Open Music is incompatible with the first section of the Open Source Definition as well as the first freedom put forth in The Free Software Definition (freedom 0). Open Music is one of the general responses to the RIAA's and governmental actions against the music industry and its consumers.

"Open music" can be considered a subset of "free music" (referring to freedom). The differences of philosophy between advocates of "open source software" and  "free software" have not surfaced in the community of musicians contributing music to the copyleft commons. This may be due to the relatively recent emergence of copyleft music, as well as to the fact that software development generally involves much more collaboration and derivatization than does music production. It is not clear that open collaboration using copyleft licenses provides any significant advantages in music production, as open source advocates commonly argue is the case for software development.

Several websites have surfaced to provide musicians with the platform and tools necessary for online music collaboration.  Most of these sites promote one or more of the Creative Commons licenses, allowing derivative works and sharing of the finished songs.  Early implementations of these collaboration sites relied on threaded discussion forum software and FTP to provide a means for musicians to initiate and discuss projects, and to share multi-track files.  More recent and modern sites provide robust project-management features, automatic encoding and compression, online playback streaming, web-based upload and download options, chat, and project-based discussion forums.

There are plenty of artists that use Creative Commons Licenses. One of the most open licences is "Creative Commons Attribution" License.

See also 
 Free music
 IMSLP
 List of musical works released in a stem format
 Mutopia
 Open Music Model
 Podsafe 
 Royalty free music
 Splice (platform)

References

Open content
Free music

de:Freie Musik